Marion Hume (born 3 July 1962) is a screenwriter, TV writer and fashion journalist based in London, England. She is best known for having been
Editor-in-Chief of Vogue Australia.

Early life and education 
Hume was born in Birmingham in 1962. She attended Exeter University from 1981 until 1984.

Career

1980s

Hume started her fashion writing career at the dawn of the AIDS crisis in London. With Roger Walker-Dack, she co-founded Fashion Acts, one of the first fundraisers for HIV/AIDS causes, working in association with the Terrence Higgins Trust. Fashion Acts generated funds by the sale of photographs donated by talents from across the industry including Helmut Newton and Linda McCartney. Hume was the Fashion Writer for The Sunday Times from 1988 until 1990.

In 1989 Hume was tagged by independent filmmakers Freelance Film Partners as the insider they needed for a BBC six-part series called The Look. For the next two years, she worked on the series and also appeared in 5 of the 6 episodes. Interview subjects included Gianni Versace, Donatella Versace, Giorgio Armani, Ralph Lauren, Donna Karan and Christian Lacroix. The episode entitled Runway was the first to chart the evolution of the Supermodel. Yves Saint Laurent refused to be interviewed for the hour-long documentary about him, although close associates including Pierre Berge, Catherine Deneuve, Paloma Picasso and Betty Catroux did speak on his behalf and Saint Laurent himself was filmed backstage at his haute couture shows and at his 30th Fashion Birthday at the Opera Bastille, Paris. In 2021 Hume was invited to address the students of Central St Martins on the making of the series.

1990s
Hume was the launch fashion editor of the UK edition of Esquire in 1990. From 1993 to 1996, Hume was fashion editor of The Independent, during which time the fashion coverage expanded in both the daily and the Independent on Sunday. Her profiles included Patsy from Ab Fab, aka Joanna Lumley,  Lauren Hutton, Veruschka, Fabien Baron and the photographers Steven Meisel and Peter Lindbergh. She reviewed Alexander McQueen’s first show. A review of a Chanel show entitled "No Way to treat a Lady" started a feud with Karl Lagerfeld, with Hume praised for "not being part of the 'conspiracy of silence'; for her professionalism, her integrity and her independence". In 1996 Hume joined The Financial Times, filing weekly fashion updates. The same year, she was the writer and associate producer of The South Bank Show special on John Galliano (season 20, episode 12, 1997) directed by Nigel Wattis, hosted by Melvyn Bragg.

Vogue Australia
In 1997 Hume became Editor of Vogue Australia, a position she held for just under two years during which managing a team which included today's Editor, Edwina McCann and Creative Director, Jill Davison. After her tenure at Vogue came to an abrupt and well-documented end, she was called back to Vogue USA. There, she served as acting features director. Hume then left to join Harper’s Bazaar USA as contributing editor. She appeared in Vogue Australia’s 60th anniversary issue in December 2019.

Australian Financial Review
Hume served as International Fashion Editor for the AFR for 14 years during which the magazine won best in class at Australia’s media awards seven times. HRH The Prince of Wales allowed unprecedented access in his first-ever interview on sustainable fashion (2018).

Activism
Hume served for five years as the Senior Consultant for the United Nations’ ITC Ethical Fashion Initiative linking those at the top of the fashion chain - including Giorgio Armani and Vivienne Westwood - to marginalised artisans in the slums of Nairobi. She served with the United Nations Foundation designing a fund generator using contemporary art by Jeff Koons which raised over US$6 million in a single night for health programs for the under-5s.

During London’s first lockdown in the Spring of 2020, she founded Siren Call, which linked together those across the fashion industry who would never normally collaborate - from Browns to Primark - to supply non-PPE clothing essentials to more than 8,000 paramedics and other front-line staff serving Greater London.

Lee Miller

An expert on the American WW2 Photojournalist, Lee Miller, she appears in “Lee Miller. A Life on the Front Line” first broadcast on BBC 2 in May 2020 which has since won two BAFTA awards. Hume is also a writer for the screenplay of an upcoming film on Miller's life.

Personal life 
In 1990 Hume married photographer Peter Hunt. In the early 2000's she became an Australian citizen.

Awards 

 1985: Honey magazine Young Journalist of the Year Award

Books
 Philip Treacy, Rizzoli 2015
 Black on White: opinions and reflections about design (contributor, edited by Jose Antonia Gimenez), Hiatus, 2013.
 The Fashion Pack, Penguin, 2005.
 The Cutting Edge: 50 years of British Fashion (contributor, edited by Amy de La Haye), The Victoria & Albert Museum, 1998.

Television documentaries
 The South Bank Show special: John Galliano, season 20, episode 12, 1997.
 The Look, BBC, 1992.
 The BoF Show with Imran Amed, Bloomberg Quicktake, 2021.

External links 

 Official website

References

1962 births
Living people
20th-century women journalists
Alumni of the University of Exeter
British fashion journalists
British women's rights activists
Sustainability advocates
People from Birmingham, West Midlands